Dragan Dojčin (born 22 January 1976) is a Serbian former professional basketball player.

External links
 Dragan Dojčin at euroleague.net
 Dragan Dojčin at abaliga.com

1976 births
Living people
Alba Berlin players
BC Khimik players
KK Beopetrol/Atlas Beograd players
KK Zlatorog Laško players
KK Zdravlje players
Panionios B.C. players
Power forwards (basketball)
Serbian expatriate basketball people in Germany
Serbian expatriate basketball people in Greece
Serbian expatriate basketball people in Russia
Serbian expatriate basketball people in Slovenia
Serbian men's basketball players